Nitori Co., Ltd is a Japanese furniture and home accessories retail company. It is the largest furniture and home furnishing chain in Japan. Founded in 1967 by the company's current President Akio Nitori. Nitori currently has more than 400 stores in Japan and more than 50 stores in Taiwan, the United States and China.

Nitori's headquarters are located in Sapporo, Japan.

The company's products are sold in the United States under the Aki-Home brand name.

History

 1967 - Established NITORI furniture store in Sapporo
 1973 - Adopted direct purchasing scheme from vender
 1975 - Built Japan's first air dome opened Nango store
 1980 - Introduced the first automated vertical warehouse in the Japanese distribution industry
 1986 - Began full-scale direct imports of overseas products
 1987 - Invested in furniture manufacture, Marumitsu Woodwork, effectively establishing it as a subsidiary
 1993 - Opened first Honshu store
 1994 - Commenced operations at own plants overseas
 2000 - Opened Kanto distribution center
 2003 - Achieved Sales 100 billion Japanese yen and 100 stores
 2004 - Entered the online sales business
 2007 - Opened Kaohsiung Dream Time store in Taiwan, the first store overseas
 2009 - Achieved Sales 200 billion Japanese yen and 200 stores
 2011 - Launched new format "Deco Home" and commenced shopping mall business in operations by NITORI
 2012 & 2013 - Achieved Sales 340 billion Japanese Yen and 300 stores
 2013 - Opened "Aki-Home", the first store in the United States
 2014 - Opened first store in Wuhan, China
2022 - Opened its first store in Malaysia at LaLaport Bukit Bintang City Centre. A second store will also be opening in third quarter of the year at IOI City Mall in Putrajaya. At the same time, Singapore opened the Nitori furniture outlet at Courts Nojima at The Heeren on 31 March 2022 in Orchard Road.

References

Retail companies established in 1967
1967 establishments in Japan
Retail companies of Japan
Companies based in Sapporo
Furniture retailers
Japanese brands